Hotel Statler may refer to:

 Statler Hotels, chain of hotels founded by Ellsworth Milton (E. M.) Statler
 former name of Hotel Pennsylvania in New York City, see Hotel Pennsylvania#History
 Hotel Statler (St. Louis, Missouri), listed on the NRHP in Missouri
 Hotel Statler, building listed on the NRHP in Cleveland, Ohio
 The Statler Hotel, the teaching hotel of the Cornell University School of Hotel Administration